Kavet may be,

Kavet language
Gregg Kavet